DFH may refer to

Designs for Health, a premium supplements company
Dong Fang Hong, a Chinese space satellite program
China Railways DFH shunting locomotives
China Railways DFH mainline locomotives
Discovery Fit and Health, a television network owned by Discovery Communications
Dynamic frequency hopping, in wireless networking
, German for Franco-German University

See also
Dong Fang Hong (disambiguation)